The Genoese Palace, alternatively known as the Palace of the Podestà, is a medieval palace in Galata (the modern Karaköy quarter in the Beyoğlu district of Istanbul), which was a colony of the Republic of Genoa between 1273 and 1453.

It was built in 1314 (damaged by fire in 1315 and repaired in 1316) by Montano de Marinis, the Podestà of Galata. In terms of design it was modeled after the 13th-century wing of the Palazzo San Giorgio in Genoa, Italy.

The building's appearance remained largely unchanged until 1880, when its front (southern) facade on Bankalar Caddesi (facing the Golden Horn), together with about two-thirds of the building, was demolished for constructing the street's tramway line. The front facade was later reconstructed in the 1880s with a different style and became a 5-floor office building named Bereket Han, while its rear (northern) facade on Kart Çınar Sokak (and the remaining one-third of the palace building) has retained the materials and design of the original structure, but needs restoration.

It is a short walk to the left (west) of the Camondo Steps, along what was once the Rue Camondo and is now Kart Çınar Sokak. 

In 2021 the Genoese coat-of-arms on its surviving rear facade on Kart Çınar Sokak was stolen.

In 2022 the building was put up for sale after years of neglect.

References

External links
Comparison of the ruins of the Genoese Palace and the 13th-century wing of the Palazzo San Giorgio in Genoa, Italy
The rear (left) and front (right) facades of the Genoese Palace today

Buildings and structures in Beyoğlu
Palaces in Turkey
Republic of Genoa
Buildings and structures completed in 1314